Southeastern Oregon is a geographical term for the area along the borders of the U.S. state of Oregon with Idaho, California, and Nevada. It includes the populous areas of  Burns, Klamath Falls and Lakeview. The region is also known by its nickname of the Oregon Outback.

Counties

Cities and towns

See also
Oregon Outback
Harney Basin

References

Regions of Oregon